Radomír Šimůnek Sr. (8 April 1962 in Plzeň – 10 August 2010 in Kamenice) was a Czech racing cyclist who mainly participated in cyclo-cross. Šimůnek's son, Radomír Šimůnek Jr. is also a cyclo-cross cyclist.

During the Czech communist era he was a two time amateur World Champion, but was unable to become a professional cyclist. The earnings he garnered from international matches in Belgium and the Netherlands were paid to the Czechoslovakia Cycling Union and Šimůnek did not receive his winnings. The political change in Eastern Europe in 1989 and 1990 finally allowed him to become a professional, before he won the World title at the 1991 World Championships in Gieten.

In 1992 he was sentenced to 18 months in prison for causing a traffic accident that killed three people. He received a presidential pardon four months into his sentence.

Honours

1980 : 1st in Junior World Championships
1982 : 2nd in Amateur World Championships
1983 : 1st in Amateur World Championships
1984 : 1st in Gieten
1984 : 1st in Amateur World Championships
1985 : 1st in Rome
1989 : 2nd in Amateur World Championships
1990 : 1st in Rome
1990 : 1st in Steinmaur
1990 : 1st in Valkenswaard
1990 : 1st in Zarautz
1990 : 1st in Koksijde
1991 : 1st in Czech elite national championships
1991 : 1st in Plzeň
1991 : 1st in Valkenswaard
1991 : 1st in Elite World Championships
1991 : 1st in Zillebeke
1992 : 1st in Czech elite national championships
1994 : 1st in Milan
1994 : 1st in Plzeň
1994 : 1st in Schulteiss-Cup
1996 : 3rd in Czech elite national championships
1996 : 1st in Hlinsko
1997 : 1st in Czech elite national championships
1997 : 1st in Hlinsko
1997 : 1st in Kolín
1998 : 1st in Magstadt
1998 : 1st in Czech elite national championships
1999 : 3rd in Czech elite national championships
1999 : 1st in Olomouc
2000 : 2nd in Czech elite national championships

References

1962 births
2010 deaths
Sportspeople from Plzeň
Czech male cyclists
Cyclo-cross cyclists
UCI Cyclo-cross World Champions (men)
Deaths from cirrhosis
Czech prisoners and detainees
Prisoners and detainees of Czechoslovakia